Xing'an (t, s, Xīng'ān) is the atonal pinyin romanization of various Chinese words and names. It may refer to:

 Xing'an County in Guangxi
 Xing'an Province, a former division of Manchuria
 Xing'an District in Hegang, Heilongjiang
Xing'an, Hebei, a town in Gaocheng District
Xing'an, Heilongjiang, a town in Mohe

See also
 Khingan (disambiguation), various mountain ranges in northern China and in Mongolia
 Hinggan (disambiguation), the Manchu form of the same name